Tommaso Ragno is an Italian stage and film actor.

Biography

Early life and education 
Tommaso Ragno was born on 1 June 1967 in Vieste, a coastal town in the province of Foggia, as the eldest of two children. His family, mainly from Apulia and on the grand-maternal side from ex-Yugoslavia, moved to Piacenza when he was two years old. Always having been very introverted, he spent a lot of time in solitude reading books and studying literature, planning on becoming a writer. However, later he went on to study acting at the Paolo Grassi School of Dramatic Art in Milan.

After having spent a part of his life living in Berlin, Ragno currently resides in Rome, where he has also spent the pandemic lockdown.

Stage and film career 
In 1988, he debuted as a stage actor in the Greek tragedy La seconda generazione, a collection of pieces by Aeschylus, Sophocles and Euripides directed by Mario Martone. Since the 1990s, he has worked repeatedly with Carlo Checci, whom he calls his "greatest teacher".

He made his film debut in 1997 starring in We All Fall Down by Davide Ferrario. In 2001 he was the lead in Chimera, directed by Pappi Corsicato, and in 2007, alongside Isabelle Huppert, in Medea Miracle by Tonino De Berdani. He also starred in The Council of Egypt (2002), L'uomo privato (2007), Me and You (2012), Like Crazy (2016) and Bloody Richard (2017).

In 2018, he starred in Happy as Lazzaro, directed by Alice Rohrwacher, who won the Award for the best Screenplay for it at the Cannes Film Festival as well as the American National Board of Review's Best Foreign Language Film Award. In his role as the grown-up Tancredi, Ragno has been nominated at the CinEuphoria Awards for Best Ensemble - International Competition and at the Faro Island Film Festival for the Best Ensemble Performance. Other notable works he starred in include Nanni Moretti's Three Floors in 2021 and Paolo Virzì's Dry in 2022. directed by Paolo Virzi both of which were shot before the pandemic. In 2022, he won the Nastro d'Argento for the Best Supporting Actor for his role in Mario Martone's Nostalgia.

Radio and television 
Starting in 1998 with Più luce non basta directed by Elisabetta Lodoli, Ragno has played various roles in different television productions, establishing himself as the protagonist in the series Distretto di polizia and Il tredicesimo apostolo.

Since 2004 he has been narrating literary classics such as The Picture of Dorian Gray, Dracula, A Room with a View and Frankenstein on the program Ad alta voce on Rai Radio 3.

For his role of Marcello in the 2018 series Il miracolo, directed by Niccolò Ammaniti, he won the Flaiano Prize as well as the Golden Screen Award. In 2020, he played the Italian mafia boss Donatello Fadda in the fourth season of Fargo, written and directed by Noah Hawley.

Filmography

Film 
We All Fall Down (1997)
Chimera (2001)
The Council of Egypt (2002)
The Iguana (2004)
Amatemi (2005)
Along the Ridge (2006)
Medea Miracle (2007)
L'uomo privato (2007)
La passione (2010)
Missione di pace (2011)
Me and You (2012)
Pandemia (2012)
A Five Star Life (2013)
A Golden Boy (2014)
Mafia and Red Tomatoes (2014)
I Killed Napoléon (2015)
Opposites Attract (2015)
Land of Saints (2015)
Like Crazy (2016)
I peggiori (2016)
Hotel Gagarin (2017)
Bloody Richard (2017)
Happy as Lazzaro (2018)
Copperman (2019)
Divine (2020)
Il buco in testa (2021)
The Bad Poet (2021)
Three Floors (2021)
State a casa (2021)
Security (2021)
Una relazione (2021)
Vetro (2022)
Nostalgia (2022)
Burning Hearts (2022)
Dry (2022)
Robbing Mussolini (2022)
My Soul Summer (2022)

Television

Awards

References

External links 
 
 

Italian male actors
1967 births
Living people
Italian actors
People from Vieste
Nastro d'Argento winners